Darion is a masculine name; variants include Darian and Darien. Notable people with the name include:

Given name
 Darion  Atkins (born 1992), American professional basketball player
 Darion Anderson (born 1987), American basketball player
 Darion Clark (born 1994), American football player
 Darion Conner (born 1967), American football player
 Darion Copeland (born 1993), American soccer player

Surname
 Joe Darion (1917–2001), American musical theater lyricist